W70 was a two-stage, thermonuclear warhead that was developed for the MGM-52 Lance missile by the United States. Designed by Lawrence Livermore National Laboratory, the Mod 1 and Mod 2 version of the weapon entered service in 1973, while the enhanced radiation ("neutron bomb") Mod 3 weapon entered service in 1981. The last W70 warhead was dismantled in February 1996.

Design
The Mod 3 was reportedly 40% fission and 60% fusion, with two yield options.

Mod 1 and 2 weapons were produced from June 1973 to July 1977, while Mod 3 weapons were produced from August 1983 to February 1984. 900 Mod 1 and 2 warheads and 380 Mod 3 warheads were manufactured. The last warheads were retired in September 1992.

The weapon was the successor to the previous proposed Lance warhead, the W63. The weapon used a category D Permissive Action Link and had command disable, but lacked insensitive high explosives and enhanced nuclear detonation safety.

The inventor of the neutron bomb, Samuel Cohen, has criticized the description of the W70 as a "neutron bomb":
the W-70 ... is not even remotely a "neutron bomb." Instead of being the type of weapon that, in the popular mind, "kills people and spares buildings" it is one that both kills and physically destroys on a massive scale. The W-70 is not a discriminate weapon, like the neutron bomb—which, incidentally, should be considered a weapon that "kills enemy personnel while sparing the physical fabric of the attacked populace, and even the populace too."

See also
MGM-52 Lance
List of nuclear weapons

Bibliography

References

External links
 
 
 

Nuclear warheads of the United States
Lawrence Livermore National Laboratory
Military equipment introduced in the 1970s